South Carolina Highway 46 (SC 46) is a  state highway in Jasper and Beaufort counties in the Lowcountry region of South Carolina. It connects the rapidly growing communities of Hardeeville and Bluffton and serves as a parallel route to U.S. Route 278 (US 278).

Route description

Beginning at the intersection with Church Street at US 321 in unincorporated West Hardeeville, the route serves as a marked continuation of Church Street and heads southeast, The road enters the Hardeeville City Limits as it approaches a grade crossing with the CSX Charleston Subdivision as well as a junction to a small lumber yard, then intersects US 17 where Church Street becomes Main Street. Along the way it passes the community library and the city hall, and later runs beneath Interstate 95. Though no direct interchange exists with I-95, a convenient frontage road along the northbound lane provides access south to Exit 5 at US 17, more specifically the northbound on and off ramps of that interchange. Leaving the city limits, Main Street becomes Plantation Drive. Curving from direct southeast to south-southeast, the road widens just before it makes a left turn to the northeast onto SC 170 across from a former section of that route. SC 170 and SC 46 are co-signed for  crossing the Beaufort County Line in the process where it becomes May River Road until reaching a traffic circle in Pritchardville. SC 170 turns north onto four-lane Oaktie Highway, while SC 46 continues to the east along May River Road.

SC 46 follows May River Road for approximately 8 miles relatively eastbound serving as a designated state scenic byway, with marsh vistas and live oak canopies providing a quintessentially Lowcountry feel to the drive. Briefly turning northeast along the banks of the river that bears the road's name, it has one intersection with Buckwater Parkway, a four-lane divided highway serving developments in the Pritchardville-Hampton Lakes-Okatie area. After this intersection, it eventually curves back to the east. Upon entering Bluffton, the route runs along the northern edges of the original "square mile" or historic town center. Its trajectory along this part of town is short-lived though, as it makes a left turn to the north onto Bluffton Road, which continues south from that intersection as Boundary Street (a former segment of SC 46), while May River Road continues east as Bruin Road which runs towards Burnt Church Road. For , SC 46 runs northeast along Bluffton Road, but slightly more than halfway along this segment it encounters another traffic circle, this time with Bluffton Parkway. South Carolina Highway 46 ends at US 278 across from a gated community known as "The Crescent."

History
Established in 1939 as a renumbering of part of SC 33, it originally ran from SC 5 near Hardeeville to Bluffton then south to Brighton Beach.  In 1956, SC 46 was rerouted at Bluffton: north replacing part of SC 462 then east to a ferry to Hilton Head Island; its old alignment to Brighton Beach became Alljoy Road (S-7-13).  In 1957, the ferry to Hilton Head Island was replaced with bridges leaving behind Fording Island Road (S-7-242).  By 1967, SC 46 was truncated at its current endpoint north of Bluffton; all east of point became part of US 278.

The first SC 46 was an original state route; from SC 41 in Moncks Corner, to SC 45 in Ferguson.  In 1939, SC 46 was renumbered as part of SC 6.  Today, much of old SC 46 is under Lake Moultrie.

Major Intersections

South Carolina Highway 46Y

South Carolina Highway 46Y (SC 46Y) was a connector that was established by 1940 between U.S. Route 17 (US 17) and SC 46 in Hardeeville. By 1943, it was decommissioned and downgraded to secondary roads.

See also

References

External links

 
 SC 46 at Virginia Highways' South Carolina Highways Annex
 Former SC 46-Y at Virginia Highways' South Carolina Highways Annex

046
Transportation in Jasper County, South Carolina
Transportation in Beaufort County, South Carolina